Gitta may refer to:

Places
Gitta, Hsawlaw, village in Burma
Gita, Israel, communal settlement in Israel

People
Gitta Alpár (1903–1991), Hungarian opera singer
Gitta Bauer (1919–1990), German journalist
Gitta Connemann (born 1964), German politician
Gitta Escher (born 1957), German gymnast
Gitta Gradova (1904–1985), American pianist
Gitta Gyenes (1888–1960), Hungarian painter
Gitta Jensen (born 1972), Danish swimmer
Gitta Jønsson (1869–1950), Norwegian politician
Gitta Kutyniok (born 1972), German mathematician
Gitta Lind (1925–1974), German singer and actor
Gitta Mallasz (1907–1992), Hungarian graphic designer
Brigitte Nielsen (born 1963), Danish actress and musician who has recorded as Gitta
Gitta Sereny (1921–2012), Austrian-British biographer
Gitta-Maria Sjöberg (born 1957), Swedish opera singer
Gitta Steiner (1932–1990), American composer

See also
Gitta Discovers Her Heart, 1932 German musical film